Austris Tuminskis (born 7 June 1990) is a Latvian handball player for EHV Aue and the Latvian national team.

He also played in SK Latgols. He studied at Ludza city gymnasium. His first trainer was Andrejs Grebežs. He played in the National team U-18 and U-20. He was Latvia's best player in 2009. He averaged 5 goals per game.

He represented Latvia at the 2020 European Men's Handball Championship.

References

1990 births
Living people
Latvian male handball players